Bombazine, or bombasine, is a fabric originally made of silk or silk and wool, and now also made of cotton and wool or of wool alone. Quality bombazine has a silk warp and a worsted weft. It is twilled or corded and used for dress-material. Black bombazine was once used largely for mourning wear,
but the material had gone out of fashion by the beginning of the 20th century.

The word "bombazine" is derived by etymologists from an Anatolian word in Greek: βόμβυξ ("silkworm"), via Latin bombyx ("silkworm") and the obsolete French term bombasin, applied originally to silk but afterwards to tree-silk or cotton. Bombazine is said to have been made in England in Elizabeth I's reign, and early in the 19th century it was largely made at Norwich.

References

Woven fabrics